The Flesk River drains into Lough Leane at Killarney. The river gets a run of spring salmon early in the season, and the grilse run in late May and early June.

References 

http://www.discoverireland.ie/Activities-Adventure/river-flesk/50186

Killarney
Rivers of County Kerry